AZ Corporation is a construction firm in Afghanistan.
AZ Corporation received construction and transport contracts with NATO and the United States Department of Defense.

On August 25, 2008, two men described as the owners of AZ Corporation, Assad John Ramin and Tahir Ramin, joint citizens of Afghanistan and the United States were tricked into traveling to the United States with five other Afghan men connected with construction contracts at the Bagram Air Base.
The men were detained on charges they had bribed GIs to secure contracts at the base.

Publicly filed figures state AZ Corporation received its first contracts with the DoD, worth $14,566,865, in 2007 and 2008.  
The GIs the Ramins are accused of bribing served in Afghanistan in 2004 and 2005.

References

Construction and civil engineering companies of Afghanistan